Events in the year 1908 in Brazil.

Incumbents

Federal government

President: Afonso Pena
Vice President: Nilo Peçanha

Governors 
 Alagoas: Euclid Vieira Malta 
 Amazonas: Antônio Constantino Néri (till 23 July); Antônio Clemente Ribeiro Bittencourt (from 23 July)
 Bahia: José Marcelino de Sousa, then João Ferreira de Araújo Pinho
 Ceará: Antônio Nogueira Accioli (till 12 July); Antônio Nogueira Accioli (from 12 July)
 Goiás: Miguel da Rocha Lima
 Maranhão: Benedito Pereira Leite (till 25 May); Arthur Collares (from 25 May)
 Mato Grosso: Generoso Pais Leme de Sousa Ponce, then Pedro Celestino Corrêa da Costa
 Minas Gerais: João Pinheiro da Silva (till 25 October); Júlio Bueno Brandão (from 27 October)
 Pará: Augusto Montenegro
 Paraíba: Valfredo Leal (till 28 October); João Lopes Machado (from 28 October)
 Paraná: Joaquim Monteiro de Carvalho e Silva; Manuel de Alencar Guimarães; Francisco Xavier da Silva
 Pernambuco: Sigismundo Antônio Gonçalves (till 7 April); Herculano Bandeira de Melo (from 7 April)
 Piauí: Areolino Antônio de Abreu (till 31 March); José Lourenço de Morais e Silva (31 March - 1 July); Anísio Auto de Abreu (from 1 July)
 Rio Grande do Norte: Antonio José de Melo e Sousa (till 25 March); Alberto Maranhão (from 25 March)
 Rio Grande do Sul: Antônio Augusto Borges de Medeiros (till 25 January); Carlos Barbosa Gonçalves (from 25 January)
 Santa Catarina:
 São Paulo: 
 Sergipe:

Vice governors 
 Rio Grande do Norte:
 São Paulo:

Events
23 May - Jerônimo de Sousa Monteiro becomes the 13th president (governor) of the state of Espirito Santo.
2 July - The Argentina national football team begins a tour of Brazil, winning six and drawing one of the seven friendly games played in 13 days. 
11 August - 15 November - The Exhibition of the centenary of the opening of the Ports of Brazil was held in Urca, Rio de Janeiro.
30 October - Pedro de Alcântara, Prince of Grão-Pará, renounces his claim on the Brazilian throne in order to marry Countess Elisabeth Dobržensky de Dobrženicz.

Births
3 February - Dulcina de Moraes, stage actress and director (died 1996)
12 February - Olga Benário Prestes, German-Brazilian communist militant (in Munich; died 1942)
27 June - João Guimarães Rosa, novelist (died 1967)
5 September - Josué de Castro, activist (died 1973)
14 September - Maria Luisa Monteiro da Cunha, librarian (died 1980)
25 October - Blessed Adílio Daronch, student (died 1924)
28 November - Vitorino de Brito Freire, politician (died 1977)
13 December - Plinio Corrêa de Oliveira, Catholic intellectual and politician (died 1995)

Deaths
29 September - Joaquim Maria Machado de Assis, novelist, poet, playwright, short story writer, and monarchist (born 1839)
22 October - Artur Azevedo, dramatist, short story writer, chronicler, journalist and poet of the Parnassian school (born 1855)

References

See also 
1908 in Brazilian football

 
1900s in Brazil
Years of the 20th century in Brazil
Brazil
Brazil